Llamazares may refer to:

 Antonino Isordia Llamazares (born 1973), Mexican filmmaker
 Gaspar Llamazares  (born 1957), Spanish politician
 Julio Llamazares (born 1955), Spanish writer